Camiel Vyncke (born 18 November 1940) is a Belgian racing cyclist. He rode in the 1964 Tour de France.

References

1940 births
Living people
Belgian male cyclists
Place of birth missing (living people)